A circuit-level gateway is a type of firewall.

Circuit-level gateways work at the session layer of the OSI model, or as a "shim-layer" between the application layer and the transport layer of the TCP/IP stack. They monitor TCP handshaking between packets to determine whether a requested session is legitimate. Information passed to a remote computer through a circuit-level gateway appears to have originated from the gateway. Firewall traffic is cleaned based on particular session rules and may be controlled to acknowledged computers only. Circuit-level firewalls conceal the details of the protected network from the external traffic, which is helpful for interdicting access to impostors. Circuit-level gateways are relatively inexpensive and have the advantage of hiding information about the private network they protect. However, they do not filter individual packets.

See also
 Application firewall
 Application-level gateway firewall
 Bastion host
 Dual-homed

External links
 http://netsecurity.about.com/cs/generalsecurity/g/def_circgw.htm
 http://www.softheap.com/internet/circuit-level-gateway.html
 http://www.pcstats.com/articleview.cfm?articleid=1450&page=5

Internet architecture
Network socket
Transmission Control Protocol